Chandima Gunaratne (born 24 February 1982) is a Sri Lankan cricketer.

References

1982 births
Living people
Asian Games medalists in cricket
Cricketers at the 2014 Asian Games
Asian Games bronze medalists for Sri Lanka
Medalists at the 2014 Asian Games
People from Southern Province, Sri Lanka
Sri Lankan women cricketers
Sri Lanka women One Day International cricketers
Sri Lanka women Twenty20 International cricketers